The National Association of Intercollegiate Athletics Women's Basketball national championship has been held annually since 1981. The NAIA Women's Tournament was established one year before the NCAA Women's Basketball tournament. It was created to crown a women's national title for smaller colleges and universities. From 1992 to 2020, the NAIA sponsored a women's division II championship tournament. The entire tournament is played in Sioux City, Iowa. Prior to the merger of D-I and D-II, a separate Division I tournament was held in Billings, Montana, while the Division II tournament was in Sioux City. Contracts for host cities for both divisions initially expired in 2017. Following renewals, the 2018 and 2019 tournaments were held in the same cities, but in 2020, the tournaments were called off due to the COVID-19 outbreak.

Results

Single division (1981–1991)
For the first eleven years that the NAIA sponsored women's basketball, it held a single national championship for all programs across its entire membership. The tournament field was initially set at eight before later expansions to 16 and 32 teams.

Division I (1992–2020)

The NAIA Women's Basketball National Championship Tournament was held at the Rimrock Auto Arena at MetraPark in Billings, Montana and has been played there since in 2012. The NAIA was the only international intercollegiate athletic association in North America; the NAIA Division I Women's Basketball Championship was the first championship to feature a college from outside the United States in the championship game. Former member Simon Fraser University was the national DI runner-up in 1996 and 1997. Oklahoma City University has the most tournament championships with 9, and most championship game appearances with 11.

Single division (2021–present)
In 2018, the NAIA announced a new format for the 2021 tournament after the merger of Divisions I and II.

Championships by school
Division II titles are not included in this list. Schools in italics are no longer in the NAIA.

 Schools highlighted in pink are closed or no longer sponsor athletics.
 Schools highlight in yellow have reclassified athletics from the NAIA.

See also
 NAIA Division II Women's Basketball Championship
 AIAW women's basketball tournament
 NCAA Division I women's basketball tournament
 NCAA Division II women's basketball tournament
 NCAA Division III women's basketball tournament
 NAIA Men's Basketball Championships
NAIA Division II Men's Basketball Championship

References

External links
 

Basketball, Women
Championships
College women's basketball competitions in the United States
Postseason college basketball competitions in the United States
NAIA basketball